The 1951 Fresno State Bulldogs football team represented Fresno State College—now known as California State University, Fresno—as an independent during the 1951 college football season. 
Led by Duke Jacobs in his second and final season as head coach, the Bulldogs compiled a record of 5–5. Fresno State played home games at Ratcliffe Stadium on the campus of Fresno City College in Fresno, California.

Schedule

References

Fresno State Bulldogs
Fresno State Bulldogs football seasons
Fresno State Bulldogs football